The Lavradeiro or Roraima Wild Horse (in Portuguese: cavalo lavradeiro) is a feral horse that inhabits the savannah region of Lavrado in the northeast of the state of Roraima, in Northern Brazil. It is considered one of the main symbols of the state and is one of the last populations of wild horses in the world, currently at risk of extinction.

In 1997, the Brazilian Agricultural Research Corporation (Embrapa) in Roraima started a herd of plough horses to study and preserve the breed, which still persists today.

The breed originated from abandoned horses that descended from European horses (notably the Garrano and the Andalusian horse) brought to the region by the Portuguese in the 18th century. After centuries of natural selection, horses of the breed have developed morphological and genetic characteristics that provided high resistance to common diseases and parasites in the region. There is also considerable participation of the thoroughbred in the origins of the breed since Roraima borders Guyana, formerly British Guiana, a colony of England.

Features

The head is surmounted by small ears. The back is short and the croup has a slight inclination. Mane and tail are hairy and very thick. The coat is generally bay, chestnut, iron grey or roan. Lavradeiro has been the subject of studies on its blood proteins and on its RAPD markers.

The breed is known for its excellent resistance to equine infectious anaemia. It also has an optimal adaptation to its biotope and very good fertility. Therefore, it's potential as an animal genetic resource is recognised. These horses are reputed to be intelligent, and docile once broken in.

Distribution 

The Lavradeiro is classified as a Brazilian breed locally adapted to the local biotope, in the DAD-IS1 database. The Lavradeiro is unique to the state of Roraima, in Northern Brazil.

In 1992, 1,200 Lavradeiros were listed in Brazil, with a downward trend; there is a management and conservation program for the breed. In particular, germplasm is conserved under the supervision of Embrapa in Roraima, for research purposes. In 2010, the population of Lavradeiro horses was between 1,260 and 1,680 individuals. No threat level is reported for this breed in the DAD-IS1.

See also 

 Introduced species
 Garrano
 Andalusian horse
 Thoroughbred

References 

Horse breeds originating in Brazil